Liam Ó Dúgáin was an Irish scribe who flourished in the mid-19th century.

A native of Claregalway, Ó Dúgáin was a relation of Tomás Bacach Ó Dúgáin and Maolsheachlainn Ó Dúgáin, all of the same parish. His scribal work consists of songs.

See also
Seán Mór Ó Dubhagáin (died 1372), Gaelic-Irish poet.
Patrick Duggan (10 November 1813 – 15 August 1896), Roman Catholic Bishop of Clonfert.
Seánie Duggan (1922–2013), retired Irish sportsman.
Jeremiah Duggan (1980–2003), British student who died in disputed circumstances linked to the LaRouche movement.

References
Scríobhaithe Lámhscríbhinní Gaeilge I nGaillimh 1700-1900, William Mahon, in "Galway:History and Society", 1996

People from County Galway
Irish-language writers
Irish scribes
19th-century Irish writers